Driving is the process of controlling a vehicle.

Driving or drivin' may also refer to:

 Driving (horse), the control of an equine harnessed to a vehicle or to a piece of mobile equipment that, for example, carries out agricultural work
 Driving (social), the act of influencing a person's behaviour
 Combined driving, an equestrian sport involving carriage driving
 Driving force, an externally applied force that changes the frequency of a harmonic oscillator 
 Herding, the act of influencing livestock to move in a particular direction

Art and entertainment
 alternate name for In the Car, a Roy Lichtenstein painting
 "Drivin'" (Pearl Harbor and the Explosions song), 1979
 "Drivin'" (The Kinks song), 1969